Lucas Luhr (born 22 July 1979) is a German BMW factory racing driver, currently competing for BMW and Rahal Letterman Lanigan Racing in the GTLM category of the Tudor United SportsCar Championship.

Early career
Born in Mülheim-Kärlich, Luhr began his career in karts in 1989.  Throughout the early 1990s, he won several local and national karting trophies.  He became a factory driver for the CRG company in 1994, winning the European Karting Championship and placing 4th in the Karting World Championship. In 1995 he moved to the Jolly Kart factory team, competing in the European and World championships.

Luhr moved to cars in 1996, becoming vice-champion of the German Formula Ford championship.  He raced in the German Formula Three Championship in 1997 and 1998, winning the 1998 season opening round at the Hockenheimring.

Porsche factory career
Luhr became a Porsche factory driver for the 1999 season.  He won the 1999 Porsche Carrera Cup Deutschland championship driving for the UPS Junior Team.  In 2000, he moved to the American Le Mans Series, driving a Porsche 911 GT3-R for Dick Barbour Racing and partnering with Dirk Müller.  He collected class wins in the 12 Hours of Sebring, 24 Hours of Le Mans, 1000 km Nürburgring, and Race of 1000 Years in Adelaide, as well as the ALMS GT class championship in his first season.

Luhr began the 2001 season with a class win in the 24 Hours of Daytona, driving for White Lightning Racing. In the ALMS, he partnered with Sascha Maassen at Alex Job Racing, again in a 911. The duo won the 12 Hours of Sebring, but had a disappointing season as the BMW M3 GTRs dominated the season. Luhr and Maassen finished 4th in the championship.

In 2002, Luhr and Maassen dominated the ALMS GT class, winning seven of ten races, including Sebring and Petit Le Mans. Luhr also won the GT class at Le Mans, driving with Kevin Buckler and Timo Bernhard for The Racer's Group.

For 2003, Luhr continued his winning ways with Maassen and AJR.  The duo Sebring for the third straight year, giving Luhr his fourth straight class win, tying him with Bob Holbert for most consecutive class wins. In June, the pair, joined by Emmanuel Collard, captured the GT class at Le Mans. Luhr and Maassen would take 5 wins from 9 races and win the ALMS GT championship for the second straight year.

After a second place at Sebring, Luhr moved to the FIA GT Championship for the 2004 season.  He and Maassen won 6 races driving for Friesinger Motorsport and won their third consecutive championship together.

In 2005, Luhr's primary job was the development of the new Porsche RS Spyder, which was to make its full-time debut in 2006.  He also raced in the big events in 911s, winning the 12 Hours of Sebring and the Spa 24 Hours.  Luhr also won the Laguna Seca 4 Hours LMP2 class, in the debut race of the RS Spyder.

For 2006, Luhr rejoined Maassen, but moved to Penske Racing to drive the RS Spyder.  The duo had a rough start to the season, netting only one class win.  Luhr would finish the season driving with Romain Dumas and take two more victories to end as vice-champion with Maassen.  Luhr also won the 24 Hours Nürburgring overall, driving with Timo Bernhard, Marcel Tiemann, and Mike Rockenfeller.

Audi career
For 2007, Luhr became a factory Audi driver. Luhr raced in the Deutsche Tourenwagen Masters (DTM) series, driving an Audi A4 DTM for Audi Sport Team Rosberg. He participated in the 24 Hours of Le Mans, driving the LMP1 class R10 TDI.

In 2008 he drove in the American Le Mans Series with Marco Werner in an Audi R10, the pair won the LMP1 class drivers title after six overall wins and eight class wins. He was also fourth overall at Le Mans.

In the 2009 24 Hours of Le Mans race, Luhr crashed Audi's new R15 TDI into a tire wall during the 7th hour. Race officials declared the car unable to finish the race.

For 2010, Luhr has been driving in select events for Audi factory-supported teams in GT races. He competed in the VLN and at the Nürburgring 24 Hours for Team Abt Sportsline, and also for Phoenix Racing at the Spa 24 Hours. He also competed in the Rolex 24 at Daytona finishing 3rd for Level 5 Motorsports.

Post-Audi career
In 2011, Luhr competed in the FIA GT1 World Championship for JR Motorsports, winning the drivers' championship with Michael Krumm in a Nissan GT-R.

For 2012, Luhr competed in the American Le Mans Series for Muscle Milk Motorsports, where he was the LMP1 champion and the Rolex Sports Car Series for Starworks Motorsport where he finished 12th in points with one race win. In 2013 he has returned to Muscle Milk in ALMS LMP1 and also won the 24 Hours Nürburgring SP7 class in a Manthey Racing Porsche.

On 26 July 2013 it was announced that Luhr would make his IndyCar Series debut with Sarah Fisher Hartman Racing at Sonoma Raceway in conjunction with RW Motorsports. It was his first open wheel race since he competed in German Formula Three in 1998.

Top Speed
Luhr was featured, along with Marion Jones and Marla Streb, in the large format film, Top Speed, hosted by Tim Allen. Luhr's appearance in the film focuses on his championships in the 24 Hours of Le Mans while he was driving for Porsche. The film was produced by MacGillivray Freeman Films.

Accolades
FIA GT1 World Championship GT1 class champion: 2011
American Le Mans Series LMP1 class champion: 2008, 2012, 2013
American Le Mans Series LMP2 class champion: 2006
American Le Mans Series GT class champion: 2000, 2002, 2003
FIA GT N-GT class champion: 2004
24 Hours of Le Mans GT class winner: 2000, 2002, 2003
12 Hours of Sebring GT/GT2 class winner: 2000, 2001, 2002, 2003, 2005
24 Hours Nürburgring overall winner: 2006, 2011
Spa 24 Hours GT2 class winner: 2005
Petit Le Mans GT class winner: 2002
24 Hours of Daytona GT class winner: 2001
Porsche Supercup champion: 1999

Racing record

24 Hours of Le Mans results

Complete DTM results
(key) (Races in bold indicate pole position) (Races in italics indicate fastest lap)

† Retired, but was classified as he completed over 90% of the race winner's distance.

Complete GT1 World Championship results

IndyCar Series results
(key) (Races in bold indicate pole position) (Races in italics indicate fastest lap)

Complete WeatherTech SportsCar Championship results
(key) (Races in bold indicate pole position) (Races in italics indicate fastest lap)

Complete NASCAR results

Whelen Euro Series – EuroNASCAR PRO
(key) (Bold – Pole position. Italics – Fastest lap. * – Most laps led. ^ – Most positions gained)

 Season still in progress.

References

External links

Official website
Fourtitude Magazine profile
Top Speed Official Website
MacGillivray Freeman Official Website

1979 births
Living people
German racing drivers
Deutsche Tourenwagen Masters drivers
FIA GT Championship drivers
German Formula Three Championship drivers
24 Hours of Daytona drivers
24 Hours of Le Mans drivers
American Le Mans Series drivers
FIA GT1 World Championship drivers
People from Mayen-Koblenz
Racing drivers from Rhineland-Palatinate
Rolex Sports Car Series drivers
Porsche Supercup drivers
Blancpain Endurance Series drivers
FIA World Endurance Championship drivers
IndyCar Series drivers
WeatherTech SportsCar Championship drivers
24 Hours of Spa drivers
Team Penske drivers
Sarah Fisher Racing drivers
Audi Sport drivers
Team Joest drivers
Jota Sport drivers
Team Rosberg drivers
BMW M drivers
Rahal Letterman Lanigan Racing drivers
Porsche Motorsports drivers
Nürburgring 24 Hours drivers
Abt Sportsline drivers
Rowe Racing drivers
Cheever Racing drivers
Level 5 Motorsports drivers
Starworks Motorsport drivers
Porsche Carrera Cup Germany drivers